Vyaltsev or Vialtsev is a Russian masculine surname, its feminine counterpart is Vyaltseva or Vialtseva. It may refer to
Anastasia Vyaltseva (1871–1913), Russian mezzo-soprano singer
Egor Vyaltsev (born 1985), Russian basketball player

Russian-language surnames